Mark Harrison  is the name of:

Mark Harrison (American football) (born 1990), American football player
Mark Harrison (comics) (born 1963), British comic book artist
Mark Harrison (footballer) (born 1960), English footballer
T. Mark Harrison, professor of geochemistry

See also
Marc Harrison (1936–1998), industrial designer
Harrison (name)